Nicola Piovani (born 26 May 1946) is an Italian light-classical musician, theater and film score composer, and winner of the 1998 Best Original Dramatic Score Oscar for the score of the Roberto Benigni film La Vita è bella, better known to English-speaking audiences as Life Is Beautiful.

Biography 
After high school, Piovani enrolled at the Sapienza University of Rome, receiving his degree in piano from the Verdi Conservatory in Milan in 1967, and later studied orchestration under the Greek composer Manos Hadjidakis.

In 1971 and 1973 collaborated for the music of two albums of the songwriter Fabrizio De André: Storia di un impiegato and Non al denaro non all'amore né al cielo. In 2008, after De André departure, Piovani wrote the music for the film Amore che vieni, amore che vai, inspired by a novel of De André himself, Un destino ridicolo.

Among his more popular works is the score for the Federico Fellini film Intervista, his second of three collaborations with the famous director, the others being Ginger e Fred (Ginger and Fred in English) and La voce della luna (The Voice of the Moon). Years later, he composed a ballet titled Balletto Fellini.

In 2000 his Academy Award-winning score for La Vita è bella (Life Is Beautiful) was further nominated for a Grammy Award in the "Best Instrumental Composition Written for a Motion Picture, Television or Other Visual Media" category, losing to Randy Newman. In 2005 he was a member of the jury at the 27th Moscow International Film Festival. In light of his recent work with French directors, notably Danièle Thompson, Philippe Lioret, and Éric-Emmanuel Schmitt, the French Minister of Culture gave him the title of Chevalier (Knight) of the Ordre des Arts et des Lettres on 21 May 2008 at the Cannes Film Festival.
 
To date, Piovani has over 130 film scores to his credit, including films such as Slap the Monster on Page One (1972), The Perfume of the Lady in Black (1974), Flavia the Heretic (1974), Le Orme (1975), A Leap in the Dark (1980) The Night of the Shooting Stars (1982), and Kaos (1984). The music for the latter is considered by many as one of the best film scores ever done. However, he is reported to believe that "Too many film scores make a composer a hack, but in the theatre music is above all craftsmanship". Accordingly, he continues to work in musical theatre, and also composes concert and chamber music.

Piovani also composed the first opera Amorosa presenza on a libretto by Aisha Cerami and Nicola Piovani, based on the novel by Vincenzo Cerami and is performed at the Teatro Verdi in Trieste in January 2022.

References

External links

Official Nicola Piovani website

Biography of Nicola Piovani

1946 births
20th-century classical composers
20th-century classical pianists
20th-century Italian composers
20th-century Italian male musicians
21st-century classical composers
21st-century classical pianists
21st-century Italian composers
21st-century Italian male musicians
Best Original Music Score Academy Award winners
Chevaliers of the Ordre des Arts et des Lettres
David di Donatello winners
Ciak d'oro winners
Italian film score composers
Italian male film score composers
Italian musical theatre composers
Italian male pianists
Light music composers
Living people
Male classical pianists
Male musical theatre composers
Nastro d'Argento winners
Varèse Sarabande Records artists